Fisher Stevens (born Steven Fisher; November 27, 1963) is an American actor, director, producer and writer. As an actor, he is best known for his portrayals of Ben in Short Circuit and Short Circuit 2, Chuck Fishman on the 1990s television series Early Edition, and villainous computer genius Eugene "The Plague" Belford in Hackers. He portrays Marvin Gerard on NBC’s The Blacklist. His most recent successes include winning the 2010 Academy Award for Best Documentary Feature for The Cove and the 2008 Independent Spirit Award for Best Documentary Feature for Crazy Love. In addition, he has directed the documentary Before the Flood, which screened at the Toronto International Film Festival and by National Geographic on October 21, 2016. He stars as Hugo Baker on the HBO satirical drama series Succession.

Early life
Stevens was born Steven Fisher in 1963 in Chicago, the son of Sally, a painter and AIDS activist, and Norman Fisher, a furniture executive.

Stevens grew up in the Chicago, Illinois, area, living in Hyde Park, Highland Park, and Evanston and describes himself as a "white Jewish kid from Chicago."

His parents divorced when he was 13, after which he moved to New York with his mother. At age 16, Stevens landed his first movie role, acting in the horror film The Burning. He completed one year at New York University before deciding to pursue acting full time. He adopted the stage name "Fisher Stevens" upon joining the Screen Actors Guild because the Guild had several existing actors named "Steven Fisher".

Career
He co-founded the Naked Angels Theater Company with longtime friends Rob Morrow, Nicole Burdette, Pippin Parker, Charles Landry, Nancy Travis and Ned Eisenberg in 1986. He also co-founded Greene Street Films, a film-production company located in Tribeca, New York City, in 1996. Stevens performed as Edgar Allan Poe on Lou Reed's album The Raven in 2003. He is a harmonica player.

As an actor, he is known for his roles as Chuck Fishman on Early Edition, Seamus O'Neill on Key West, Eugene "The Plague" Belford in Hackers, Iggy in Super Mario Bros., Hawk Ganz in The Flamingo Kid, and his role as Indian character Ben Jabituya/Jahveri in Short Circuit and Short Circuit 2, respectively. His television credits include Columbo, Frasier, Friends, Law & Order, Key West, Damages, The Mentalist and Lost. He appeared on two episodes of the television series Numb3rs.

Fisher has a Broadway and off-Broadway career spanning nearly three decades. He played Jigger Craigin in the 1994 Lincoln Center revival of Rodgers and Hammerstein's Carousel. He had an early success in the 1982 Broadway production of Torch Song Trilogy playing David, the adopted son of the gay protagonist played by the show's writer Harvey Fierstein, and the original Broadway production of Brighton Beach Memoirs, where he succeeded Matthew Broderick in the starring role of Eugene. Throughout his career, he has acted in and directed more than 50 stage productions.

In 2010, Fisher co-founded a new media and documentary film company, Insurgent Media, with Andrew Karsch and Erik H. Gordon.

In June 2010, Stevens made his major theatrical directing debut with John Leguizamo's one-man show, Ghetto Klown (originally called Klass Klown), which eventually ran on Broadway from March to July 2011. The two had appeared together in a production of A Midsummer Night's Dream at The Public Theater about 20 years earlier. On July 13, 2012, PBS debuted Tales From a Ghetto Klown, a documentary about the development of the show which prominently features Stevens.

In 2010, Stevens won the Academy Award for Best Documentary Feature for co-producing The Cove.

He directed the 2012 crime story Stand Up Guys, starring Al Pacino and Christopher Walken. He teamed up with his longtime partner Alexis Bloom to direct the film Bright Lights: Starring Carrie Fisher and Debbie Reynolds, which premiered at the Cannes Film Festival in 2016. The film was a tribute to both mother and daughter as they passed in the same year. Both were close friends with Stevens.

In 2018, Stevens had a recurring role as Hugo Baker in the second season of HBO's satirical-comedy-drama series Succession. He was promoted to series regular in season 3.

In 2021, he directed the Apple TV drama film Palmer, starring Justin Timberlake.

Personal life
Stevens dated actress Michelle Pfeiffer from 1989 until 1992. Stevens later dated longtime filmmaking partner and producer Alexis Bloom. The couple married in 2017 in a private ceremony. They have two children.

Stevens survived Hodgkin lymphoma.

Filmography

Actor

Film

Television

Director

Producer

Writer
 Sam the Man (2000, story)
 The Grean Teem (2009, story)

Narrator 
 Secondhand Souls: A Novel by Christopher Moore
 A Dirty Job by Christopher Moore
 Lamb: The Gospel According to Biff, Christ's Childhood Pal by Christopher Moore
 The Highest Tide: A Novel by Jim Lynch

Awards and nominations

References

External links

 
 
 

1963 births
20th-century American male actors
21st-century American male actors
American founders
American male film actors
American male stage actors
American male television actors
American male voice actors
Film producers from New York (state)
American television directors
Television producers from New York City
American television writers
American male television writers
American theatre directors
Broadway theatre directors
Broadway theatre producers
American documentary film directors
American documentary film producers
Film directors from Illinois
Jewish American male actors
Jewish American writers
Living people
Male actors from Chicago
Writers from Chicago
American male screenwriters
Screenwriters from New York (state)
Screenwriters from Illinois
Television producers from Illinois
Film producers from Illinois
21st-century American screenwriters
21st-century American male writers
21st-century American Jews